Darko Anić (Serbian Cyrillic: Дарко Анић; born 5 March 1974) is a retired Serbian professional footballer.

Honours
Club Brugge
 Belgian Pro League: 1997–98
 Belgian Supercup: 1998

Shandong Luneng
 Chinese FA Cup: 2004
 Chinese Super League Cup: 2004

Al-Ahli Jeddah
 Crown Prince Cup: 2007
 Saudi Federation Cup: 2007

References

External links
 

Living people
1974 births
Serbian footballers
Serbian expatriate footballers
Association football midfielders
FK Borac Čačak players
FK Vojvodina players
Red Star Belgrade footballers
Club Brugge KV players
K.A.A. Gent players
Belgian Pro League players
Süper Lig players
2. Bundesliga players
Expatriate footballers in Belgium
Expatriate footballers in Turkey
Rot Weiss Ahlen players
Expatriate footballers in Germany
Shandong Taishan F.C. players
Expatriate footballers in China
C.D. Nacional players
Rio Ave F.C. players
Primeira Liga players
Expatriate footballers in Portugal
Al-Ahli Saudi FC players
Expatriate footballers in Saudi Arabia
Serbian expatriate sportspeople in Turkey
Serbian expatriate sportspeople in China
Saudi Professional League players
People from Aranđelovac